Robert Whitehead (March 3, 1916 – June 15, 2002) was a Canadian theatre producer. His first production was Medea, starring Judith Anderson and John Gielgud, and he won the Outer Critics Circle Award five times. He was nominated for 19 Tony and Drama Desk Awards, winning 4 Tony Awards and 5 Drama Desk Awards.

Life
His father owned textile mills, and his mother, Selena Mary LaBatt Whitehead, was an opera singer. (The actor Hume Cronyn was Whitehead's cousin on the LaBatt side.)

He went to Trinity College School in Port Hope, Ontario, then worked as a commercial photographer before studying acting at the New York School of the Theatre.

He spent the Second World War years as an ambulance driver in North Africa and Italy.

Whitehead had a long-term association with fellow producer Roger L. Stevens. In 1964, the Lincoln Center Repertory Theatre opened with Robert Whitehead and Elia Kazan as its heads and Harold Clurman as literary adviser.

In 1968, Whitehead married Zoe Caldwell, who starred in The Prime of Miss Jean Brodie. (His first wife Virginia, an antique dealer whom he married in 1948, died in 1965.) The couple bought property in Pound Ridge, a mountain area in New York State, and built a house there. Caldwell, who won a Tony as Brodie, later appeared for Whitehead in a revival of Medea (with Judith Anderson as the nurse), Lillian, a one-woman show about Lillian Hellman, and Terrence McNally's Master Class, in which she played Maria Callas.

Honours
2002 Tony Award for Lifetime Achievement.  The Commercial Theater Institute gives an annual award for "Outstanding Achievement in Commercial Theater Producing" which is named for Robert Whitehead.

Broadway Productions

Master Class - Nov 05, 1995 - Jun 29, 1997
Broken Glass - Apr 24, 1994 - Jun 26, 1994
Park Your Car in Harvard Yard - Nov 07, 1991 - Feb 22, 1992
The Speed of Darkness - Feb 28, 1991 - Mar 30, 1991
Artist Descending a Staircase - Nov 30, 1989 - Dec 31, 1989
A Few Good Men - Nov 15, 1989 - Jan 26, 1991
The Petition - Apr 24, 1986 - Jun 29, 1986
Lillian - Jan 16, 1986 - Feb 23, 1986
Death of a Salesman - Sep 14, 1984 - Nov 18, 1984
Death of a Salesman - Mar 29, 1984 - Jul 01, 1984
Medea - May 2, 1982 - Jun 27, 1982
The West Side Waltz - Nov 19, 1981 - Mar 13, 1982
Lunch Hour - Nov 12, 1980 - Jun 28, 1981
Betrayal - Jan 05, 1980 - May 31, 1980
Carmelina - Apr 08, 1979 - Apr 21, 1979
Bedroom Farce - Mar 29, 1979 - Nov 24, 1979
No Man's Land - Nov 09, 1976 - Dec 18, 1976
A Texas Trilogy: The Oldest Living Graduate - Sep 23, 1976 - Oct 29, 1976
A Texas Trilogy: The Last Meeting of the Knights of the White Magnolia - Sep 22, 1976 - Oct 31, 1976
A Texas Trilogy: Lu Ann Hampton Laverty Oberlander - Sep 21, 1976 - Oct 30, 1976
1600 Pennsylvania Avenue - May 4, 1976 - May 8, 1976
A Matter of Gravity - Feb 03, 1976 - Apr 10, 1976
Cat on a Hot Tin Roof - Sep 24, 1974 - Feb 08, 1975
Finishing Touches - Feb 08, 1973 - Jun 30, 1973
The Creation of the World and Other Business - Nov 30, 1972 - Dec 16, 1972
Old Times - Nov 16, 1971 - Feb 26, 1972

Sheep on the Runway - Jan 31, 1970 - May 2, 1970
The Price - Feb 07, 1968 - Feb 15, 1969
The Prime of Miss Jean Brodie - Jan 16, 1968 - Dec 14, 1968
Where's Daddy? - Mar 02, 1966 - Mar 19, 1966
Tartuffe - Jan 14, 1965 - May 22, 1965
Incident at Vichy - Dec 03, 1964 - May 7, 1965
The Changeling - Oct 29, 1964 - Dec 23, 1964
The Physicists - Oct 13, 1964 - Nov 28, 1964
But For Whom Charlie - Mar 12, 1964 - Jul 02, 1964
Marco Millions - Feb 20, 1964 - Jun 18, 1964
Foxy - Feb 16, 1964 - Apr 18, 1964
After The Fall - Jan 23, 1964 - May 29, 1965
A Man for All Seasons - Nov 22, 1961 - Jun 01, 1963
Midgie Purvis - Feb 01, 1961 - Feb 18, 1961
The Conquering Hero - Jan 16, 1961 - Jan 21, 1961
Much Ado About Nothing - Sep 17, 1959 - Nov 07, 1959
The Cold Wind and the Warm - Dec 08, 1958 - Mar 21, 1959
The Man in the Dog Suit - Oct 30, 1958 - Nov 29, 1958
Goldilocks - Oct 11, 1958 - Feb 28, 1959
A Touch of the Poet - Oct 02, 1958 - Jun 13, 1959
The Visit - May 5, 1958 - Nov 29, 1958
The Waltz of the Toreadors - Mar 04, 1958 - Mar 29, 1958
The Day the Money Stopped - Feb 20, 1958 - Feb 22, 1958
Orpheus Descending - Mar 21, 1957 - May 18, 1957
A Hole in the Head - Feb 28, 1957 - Jul 13, 1957
The Waltz of the Toreadors - Jan 17, 1957 - May 11, 1957
The Sleeping Prince - Nov 01, 1956 - Dec 22, 1956

Major Barbara - Oct 30, 1956 - May 18, 1957
Separate Tables - Oct 25, 1956 - Sep 28, 1957
Tamburlaine the Great - Jan 19, 1956 - Feb 04, 1956
Joyce Grenfell Requests the Pleasure... - Oct 10, 1955 - Dec 03, 1955
A View From the Bridge / A Memory of Two Mondays - Sep 29, 1955 - Feb 04, 1956
The Skin of Our Teeth - Aug 17, 1955 - Sep 03, 1955
Bus Stop - Mar 02, 1955 - Apr 21, 1956
The Flowering Peach - Dec 28, 1954 - Apr 23, 1955
Portrait of a Lady - Dec 21, 1954 - Dec 25, 1954
The Confidential Clerk - Feb 11, 1954 - May 22, 1954
The Remarkable Mr. Pennypacker - Dec 30, 1953 - Jul 10, 1954
The Emperor's Clothes - Feb 09, 1953 - Feb 21, 1953
Sunday Breakfast - May 28, 1952 - Jun 08, 1952
Four Saints in Three Acts - Apr 16, 1952 - Apr 27, 1952
Golden Boy - Mar 12, 1952 - Apr 06, 1952
Mrs. McThing - Feb 20, 1952 - Jan 10, 1953
Night Music - Apr 08, 1951 - Apr 14, 1951
The Member of the Wedding - Jan 05, 1950 - Mar 17, 1951
Crime and Punishment - Dec 22, 1947 - Jan 24, 1948
Medea - Oct 20, 1947 - May 15, 1948
Heart of a City - Feb 12, 1942 - Mar 07, 1942
Mr. Big - Sep 30, 1941 - Oct 04, 1941
Steel - Dec 19, 1939 - Dec 30, 1939
Cure For Matrimony - Oct 25, 1939 - Nov 25, 1939
Reference:

Awards and nominations

1996 Tony Award® Best Play -Master Class - winner
1996 Drama Desk Award Outstanding Play -Master Class - winner
1994 Tony Award® Best Play -Broken Glass - nominee
1984 Tony Award® Best Reproduction -Death of a Salesman - winner
1984 Drama Desk Award Outstanding Revival -Death of a Salesman - winner
1979 Tony Award® Best Play -Bedroom Farce - nominee
1977 Drama Desk Award Outstanding New Play (American) -A Texas Trilogy: Lu Ann Hampton Laverty Oberlander  - winner
1977 Drama Desk Award Outstanding New Play (American) -A Texas Trilogy: The Last Meeting of the Knights of the White Magnolia  - winner
1977 Drama Desk Award Outstanding New Play (American) -A Texas Trilogy: The Oldest Living Graduate - winner
1977 Drama Desk Award Outstanding New Play (Foreign) -No Man's Land - nominee
1968 Tony Award® Best Play -The Price - nominee
1965 Tony Award® Best Producer of a Play -Tartuffe - nominee
1962 Tony Award® Best Play -A Man for All Seasons - winner
1962 Tony Award® Best Producer of a Play -A Man for All Seasons - winner
1959 Tony Award® Best Play -A Touch of the Poet - nominee
1959 Tony Award® Best Play -The Visit - nominee
1957 Tony Award® Best Play -The Waltz of the Toreadors - nominee
1957 Tony Award® Best Play -Separate Tables - nominee
1956 Tony Award® Best Play -Bus Stop - nominee
Reference:

Notes

External links

 Obituary of Robert Whitehead The Independent
 "Robert Whitehead, Who Brought Top Playwrights to Broadway, Dies at 86" by Mel Gussow The New York Times June 17, 2002

Canadian theatre managers and producers
1916 births
2002 deaths
People from Montreal
Anglophone Quebec people
People from Pound Ridge, New York
Canadian expatriates in the United States